Cliff Wirth (1927 – May 8, 2018) was an American cartoonist. He joined the Detroit News in the 1950s, and he worked for the Chicago Sun-Times from 1979 to 2002.

Selected works

References

1927 births
2018 deaths
Michigan State University alumni
American cartoonists